Vorsti may refer to several places in Estonia:

Vorsti, Jõgeva County, village in Pajusi Parish, Jõgeva County
Vorsti, Lääne-Viru County, village in Väike-Maarja Parish, Lääne-Viru County